"Sing for Me" is an English language song by Swedish singer Andreas Johnson that he presented in Melodifestivalen 2006 in a bid to represent Sweden in the Eurovision Song Contest

It was released in 2006, becoming the most successful of all his singles reaching #2 on Sverigetopplistan, the official Swedish Singles Chart and was certified gold. The song also appears on his album Mr. Johnson, Your Room Is On Fire. The album itself reached #4 on the Swedish Albums Chart.

Track listing 
 CD single
 "Sing For Me (Original Version)" - 3:04
 "Sing For Me (Acoustic Demo Version)" - 3:05
	
 CD maxi
 "Sing For Me (Original Version)" - 3:04
 "Sing For Me (Soundfactory Radio Edit)" - 3:59
 "Sing For Me (Soundfactory Futureretro Mix)" - 8:31
 "Sing For Me (Soundfactory Futureretro Dub)" - 8:40
 "Sing For Me (Acoustic Version)" - 3:05

Chart performance

Weekly charts

Year-end charts

References

External links

2006 singles
Andreas Johnson songs
Melodifestivalen songs of 2006
2006 songs